Sophie Lewis is a German-British academic and author, known for her radical ideas of family abolition and the use of surrogacy on a societal scale. Lewis has published two books; Full Surrogacy Now: Feminism against the Family, published in 2019, and Abolish the Family: A Manifesto for Care and Liberation, published in October 2022.

Biography 
Lewis studied at the University of Oxford, achieving a Bachelor of Arts in English and a master's degree in environmental policy. She completed a master's in politics at the New School For Social Research in New York City and a PhD at the University of Manchester. Lewis' PhD thesis, entitled Cyborg Labour: Exploring Surrogacy as Gestational Work, focused on the political economy of the surrogacy industry. After completing her PhD, Lewis published her first book, Full Surrogacy Now: Feminism against the Family, which was followed by Abolish the Family: A Manifesto for Care and Liberation in October 2022.

Lewis is based in Philadelphia; she is a visiting scholar at the The Alice Paul Center for Research on Gender, Sexuality and Women at the University of Pennsylvania, and teaches at the Philadelphia branch of the Brooklyn Institute for Social Research.

Ideas 
In Full Surrogacy Now: Feminism against the Family, Lewis argues that all gestation is inherently work because of the labour it demands from a pregnant person. She refers to pregnancy as an "extreme sport". Lewis advocates a future in which people do not live in family units but care for one another in larger systems.

Publications

References 

British writers
British feminists
Radical feminists
Alumni of the University of Oxford
Alumni of the University of Manchester
The New School alumni
Year of birth missing (living people)
Living people